The Naked Hills is a 1956 American Western film directed by Josef Shaftel, starring David Wayne, Keenan Wynn, and James Barton.

Plot summary 
Tracy Powell, an Indiana farmer, gets the gold fever and heads for Stockton, California in 1849. There, he abandons his first partner, Bert Killian, and teams up with Sam Wilkins, a claim jumper employed by Willis Haver. Six years later, Powell returns to Indiana and his sweetheart, Julie. They marry and he tries farming again but, on the night their son is born, he takes off again searching for gold. This time he heads for the hills with an inveterate prospector, Jimmo McCann. A decade later, the two are still hunting for their big strike when McCann is killed in an accident. Powell returns home with news of a big strike but the deserted Julie will have nothing to do with him. His friend Killian will not believe him but Haver, now a banker gives him a small loan and then beats him out of his claim. Many years pass before he comes home, now sixty years old, and this time, his wife and son open their home to him. But he vows to go prospecting come next spring.

Cast 
David Wayne as Tracy Powell
Keenan Wynn as Sam Wilkins
James Barton as Jimmo McCann
Marcia Henderson as Julie
Jim Backus as Willis Haver
Denver Pyle as Bert Killian / Narrator
Myrna Dell as Aggie
Lewis L. Russell as Baxter
Frank Fenton as Harold
Fuzzy Knight as Pitch Man
Jim Hayward as Counter Man
Christopher Olsen as Billy as a Boy
Steven Terrell as Billy as a Young Man

Soundtrack 
James Barton – "The Four Seasons" (Music by Herschel Burke Gilbert, lyrics by Bob Russell)

External links 

1956 films
1956 Western (genre) films
1956 adventure films
1950s crime films
Allied Artists films
American Western (genre) films
Films scored by Herschel Burke Gilbert
Films set in California
Films set in Indiana
Films about mining
1950s English-language films
1950s American films